Kai Martinez Jones (born January 19, 2001) is a Bahamian professional basketball player for the Charlotte Hornets of the National Basketball Association (NBA). He played college basketball for the Texas Longhorns.

Early life
Born in Nassau, Bahamas, Jones moved to the United States when he was 11 years old. Before high school, he returned to his home country hoping to pursue a career as a long jumper. At age 15, Jones played organized basketball for his first time, being drawn to the sport after having a growth spurt.

High school career
In the summer of 2017, Jones took part in a Basketball Without Borders Americas camp held by the National Basketball Association (NBA) in Nassau. That year, he worked out with and took advice from top high school recruit Deandre Ayton in their hometown of Nassau. As a result, Jones was inspired to play basketball in the United States. For the 2017–18 season, he enrolled at Orlando Christian Prep in Orlando, Florida, as a high school senior. He was teammates with five-star recruits Nassir Little and C. J. Walker and helped win the Florida High School Athletic Association (FHSAA) Class 3A state championship. In high school, Jones woke up at 4:45 a.m. every day to train and played basketball after school. At the same time, he saw academic success, graduating with a 4.2 grade point average and summa cum laude honors.

In the summer of 2018, Jones attended the NBA Global Camp in Treviso, Italy. Following his senior year, he played a postgraduate season at Brewster Academy in Wolfeboro, New Hampshire. On February 4, 2019, Jones was named to the National Prep Invitational all-tournament team. In March, he helped Brewster Academy win the USA National Prep Championship.

Recruiting
On October 15, 2018, Jones committed to play college basketball for Texas. He chose to join the Longhorns over offers from several other NCAA Division I programs, including Arizona, Kansas, and Oregon.

College career
Coach Shaka Smart said that Jones had the best work ethic of any big man he coached. Despite this, Jones struggled to get playing time early in his freshman season. He gradually saw more playing time as the season progressed, finishing with eight points on 4–5 shooting from the field in just 10 minutes of the Longhorns’ 73–71 win over McNeese State on November 30. As a freshman, Jones averaged 3.6 points and 3.2 rebounds per game. On January 26, 2021, he registered his first double-double, with 15 points and 10 rebounds in an 80–79 loss to Oklahoma. Jones was named Big 12 Sixth Man of the Year and to the All-Big 12 honorable mention. As a sophomore, he averaged 8.8 points and 4.8 rebounds per game. On March 24, 2021, Jones declared for the 2021 NBA draft.

Professional career
Jones was selected with the 19th pick in the 2021 NBA draft by the New York Knicks and immediately traded to the Charlotte Hornets. On August 3, he officially signed with the Hornets.

National team career
Jones was a member of the Bahamian junior national team at the 2017 Centrobasket Under-17 Championship in the Dominican Republic. His team finished seventh place out of eight teams.

Career statistics

NBA

|-
| style="text-align:left;"| 
| style="text-align:left;"| Charlotte
| 21 || 0 || 3.0 || .643 || .500 || .375 || .5 || .2 || .0 || .1 || 1.0
|- class="sortbottom"
| style="text-align:center;" colspan="2"| Career
| 21 || 0 || 3.0 || .643 || .500 || .375 || .5 || .2 || .0 || .1 || 1.0

College

|-
| style="text-align:left;"| 2019–20
| style="text-align:left;"| Texas
| 27 || 10 || 16.7 || .500 || .292 || .636 || 3.2 || .4 || .5 || 1.1 || 3.6
|-
| style="text-align:left;"| 2020–21
| style="text-align:left;"| Texas
| 26 || 4 || 22.8 || .580 || .382 || .689 || 4.8 || .6 || .8 || .9 || 8.8
|- class="sortbottom"
| style="text-align:center;" colspan="2"| Career
| 53 || 14 || 19.7 || .553 || .345 || .677 || 4.0 || .5 || .7 || 1.0 || 6.2

References

External links
Texas Longhorns bio

2001 births
Living people
Bahamian expatriate basketball people in the United States
Bahamian men's basketball players
Centers (basketball)
Charlotte Hornets players
Greensboro Swarm players
New York Knicks draft picks
Sportspeople from Nassau, Bahamas
Texas Longhorns men's basketball players